The 2000 Outback Bowl featured the Georgia Bulldogs and the Purdue Boilermakers. It was the 14th edition of the Outback Bowl.

Summary
Purdue quarterback Drew Brees threw touchdown passes of 3 and 11 yards to wide receiver Chris Daniels as Purdue opened up a 13–0 lead. Brees fired a 21-yard touchdown pass to Vinny Sutherland as Purdue led 19–0 at the end of the first quarter. In the second quarter, Brees fired a 32-yard touchdown pass to Chris James, and Purdue led 25–0. Georgia's Terrence Edwards scored on a 74-yard touchdown run cutting the margin to 25–7. A Georgia field goal before halftime made the score 25–10.

In the third quarter, Georgia quarterback Quincy Carter scored on an 8-yard touchdown run, and the two-point conversion attempt was good, making the score Purdue 25–18 after three quarters. In the fourth quarter, Carter found Randy McMichael for an 8-yard touchdown pass to tie the game, 25–25. In overtime, Hap Hines kicked a 21-yard field goal as Georgia escaped with a 28–25 victory.

References

External links
 https://web.archive.org/web/20080224153126/http://www.outbackbowlhistory.org/outback-bowl-2000.php

ReliaQuest Bowl
Outback Bowl
Outback Bowl
20th century in Tampa, Florida
Georgia Bulldogs football bowl games
Purdue Boilermakers football bowl games
January 2000 sports events in the United States